Stephen C. "Stevo" Roberts (born 26 April 1957 from Wisbech, Cambridgeshire) is an English professional darts player, who played in British Darts Organisation events.

Career 
Roberts wins of the 2005 Latvia Open Champions, he defeating Peter Manley of England.

Roberts is a Wisbech Super League player and makes his living as a tarmac layer. He qualified for the 2006 BDO World Darts Championship, winning one of six places available in the International Playoffs. He caused a major surprise in the first round by beating 2001 champion John Walton 3–0 in the first round before losing 4–3 in the second round to Mike Veitch.

Roberts Quit the BDO in 2010.

World Championship Results

BDO
 2006: Last 16: (lost to Mike Veitch 3–4)

References

External links
Profile and stats on Darts Database

1957 births
English darts players
Living people
British Darts Organisation players
People from Wisbech